Moumi Sebergue (born December 7, 1977) is a track and field sprint athlete who competes internationally for Chad.

Sebergue represented Chad at the 2008 Summer Olympics in Beijing. He competed at the 100 metres sprint and placed 7th in his heat without advancing to the second round. He ran the distance in a time of 11.14 seconds.

References

External links

1977 births
Living people
Chadian male sprinters
Olympic athletes of Chad
Athletes (track and field) at the 2008 Summer Olympics